Christopher Shaw (born 17 February 1964, Hemsworth, Yorkshire, England) is an English first-class cricketer,  who played sixty one first-class games for Yorkshire County Cricket Club between 1984 and 1988.  He also played in 48 List A one day matches.

Shaw also appeared for the Yorkshire Second XI (1984–1991), Yorkshire Under-25s (1984–1988), National Association of Young Cricketers North (1981–1982), National Association of Young Cricketers (1981–1982), Yorkshire Cricket Association Under-19s (1983) and also for Yorkshire in non first-class matches (1986–1988).

A right arm fast medium bowler, Shaw took 123 wickets at 33.34, with a best of 6 for 64 against Lancashire in the Roses Match.  He also took five wickets against both Kent and Northamptonshire.  Batting right-handed, he scored 340 runs at 10.96, with a top score of 31 against Nottinghamshire.  He also took nine catches.

He took 58 wickets in one day cricket, with a best analysis of 5 for 41 against Hampshire.  He scored 127 runs at 12.7, with a highest score of 26 against Glamorgan.  He took eight catches in the field.

References

External links
Cricinfo Profile
Cricket Archive Statistics

1964 births
Living people
Yorkshire cricketers
People from Hemsworth
English cricketers
Cricketers from Yorkshire